Uxue Garmendia Arregi is a Spanish football midfielder, who played for Real Sociedad in Primera División. She studied pharmacy outside of her football career.

References

1992 births
Living people
Footballers from the Basque Country (autonomous community)
Spanish women's footballers
Primera División (women) players
Women's association football midfielders
21st-century Spanish women